Vizzuality is a science and technology company focused on data visualization, web-GIS and tool development and committed to working on projects related to conservation, the environment and sustainable development. They have offices in Madrid, Cambridge and Porto.

Vizzuality is a member of the board of directors of Citizen Science Alliance that owned and operated the citizen science web portal Zooniverse.

External links
 Vizzuality website
 Citizen Science Alliance
 Global Forest Watch

References

Science websites
Citizen science